James H. Luther (January 24, 1841March 3, 1916) was a private in the Union Army and a Medal of Honor recipient for his actions in the American Civil War.

Luther joined the Army in June 1861, and mustered out with his regiment three years later.

Medal of Honor citation
Rank and organization: Private, Company D, 7th Massachusetts Infantry. Place and date: At Fredericksburg, Va., May 3, 1863. Entered service at: ------. Birth: Dighton, Mass. Date of issue: June 28, 1890.

Citation:

Among the first to jump into the enemy's rifle pits, he himself captured and brought out three prisoners.

See also

List of Medal of Honor recipients
List of American Civil War Medal of Honor recipients: A–F

References

External links

1841 births
1916 deaths
People from Dighton, Massachusetts
United States Army Medal of Honor recipients
United States Army soldiers
American Civil War recipients of the Medal of Honor
People of Massachusetts in the American Civil War